Switch was a brand of electric guitars and electric basses that featured a one-piece body-and-neck construction, made by injection moulding of a patented polyurethane resin-based synthetic material called Vibracell, very similar to Cort's Luthite. The brand belonged to the short-lived Switch Music company in the mid-2000s. The primary designer of the various Switch models was Trevor "Trev" Wilkinson, later of Fret-King. 

The company first presented their guitars at the 2004 NAMM show. The instruments weighed roughly the same as comparable wooden instruments. The sustain was described as excellent.

Fretboards are of either rosewood or synthetic Ebonol. The front and back of the guitar body were sculpted.

The design often employed garish neon colours as well multicoloured designs, in glossy finishes.

Manufacturing was in the Far East. The tuning mechanisms (machine heads) were Grover Rotomatics. The pickups were own-brand or sometimes a "Licensed by EMG" design. Floyd Rose vibrato bridges were standard in some models.

Some models were "MIDI-ready" with an in-built Roland GK-2A pickup system. Another model, the Ultima EQ, had both conventional magnetic as well as piezoelectric pickups.

References
Switch Guitars at 2005 NAMM show
2005 catalogue of the "Stealth" range (PDF)

Guitar manufacturing companies of the United States
Electric guitars
Bass guitar manufacturing companies